Hästhagen may refer to:

 Hästhagen, Nacka Municipality – a locality in Stockholm County, Sweden
 Hästhagen, Malmö – a neighbourhood in Malmö, Skåne County, Sweden